"Sometimes" is a song by The Stranglers, appearing as the first song on their debut album Rattus Norvegicus (1977). The song was written and sung by Hugh Cornwell, and credited to the band as a whole.

It was released as a single in Japan in 1977 with the B-side of "Go Buddy Go".

Overview 
The song has a distinctive leitmotif played throughout on the keyboards, backed by a heavy bass riff which repeats throughout the song. The lyrics tell of an aggressive narrator's feelings towards a person, presumably their significant other, and it tells of their feelings of wanting to hit them. The song features a guitar and keyboard solo played in the call and response style during its climactic bridge before reprising its elongated chorus.

Writing and composition 
The lyrics were written by Hugh Cornwell, inspired by an altercation between him and his girlfriend in which he caught her cheating on him and proceeded to hit her. The music was written predominantly by JJ Burnel with Hugh adding various pieces of music to Burnel's riff. The song is in the key of E minor, and features a large instrumental passage during its bridge.

Personnel 
Hugh Cornwell – lead vocals, lead and rhythm guitar
Jean-Jacques Burnel – backing vocals, bass guitar
Dave Greenfield – Hammond organ, Hohner electric piano
Jet Black – drums

References 

1977 songs
The Stranglers songs
Songs written by Hugh Cornwell
Songs written by Jean-Jacques Burnel
Songs written by Dave Greenfield
Songs written by Jet Black
Song recordings produced by Martin Rushent